The Klein Sexual Orientation Grid (KSOG) developed by Fritz Klein attempts to measure sexual orientation by expanding upon the earlier Kinsey scale. Fritz Klein founded the American Institute of Bisexuality in 1998 which is continuing his work by sponsoring bisexual-inclusive sex research, educating the general public on sexuality, and promoting the bisexual community.

Klein first described the KSOG in his 1978 book The Bisexual Option. In response to the criticism of the Kinsey scale only measuring two dimensions of sexual orientation, Klein developed a multidimensional grid for describing sexual orientation. Unlike the Kinsey scale, the Klein grid investigates sexual orientation in the past, the present and in the idealized future with respect to seven factors each, for a total of twenty-one values. The KSOG uses values of 1–7, rather than the 0–6 scale of the Kinsey scale, to describe a continuum from exclusively opposite-sex to exclusively same-sex attraction.

Overview
The KSOG is often used as a tool in research. Introduced in Klein's book The Bisexual Option the KSOG uses a seven-point scale to assess seven different dimensions of sexuality at three different points in an individual's life: past (from early adolescence up to one year ago), present (within the last 12 months), and ideal (what would be chosen if it were voluntary).

Studies using the KSOG have used cluster analysis to investigate patterns within the KSOG's twenty-one parameters, in one case suggesting a five-label (straight, bi-straight, bi-bi, bi-gay, gay) model of orientation. 

The KSOG has also been used in studies of conversion therapy.

Shortcomings

Klein, while recognizing that the grid explores many more dimensions of sexual orientation than previous scales, acknowledged that it omits the following "aspects" of sexual orientation:

 Age of partner
 Differentiation of love and friendship in the emotional preference variable
 Sexual attraction being distinguished between sexual desire and limerence
 Whether sexual activity referred to number of partners or number of occurrences
 Sex roles as well as masculine and feminine roles

While Klein held the belief that including more dimensions of sexual orientation was better, Weinrich et al. (1993) found that all of the dimensions of the KSOG seemed to be measuring the same construct. The study conducted a factor analysis of the KSOG to see how many factors emerged in two different samples. In both groups, the first factor to emerge loaded substantially on all of the grid's 21 items, indicating that this factor accounted for a majority of the variance. They further found that a second factor emerged containing time dimensions of social and emotional preferences, suggesting that those dimensions may have also been measuring something other than sexual orientation. Therefore, despite the scale being helpful in promoting the concept of sexual orientation as being multidimensional and dynamic, the additional dimensions measured do not necessarily reveal any more of an accurate description of one's overall sexual orientation than the Kinsey scale.

Another concern with the KSOG is that different dimensions of sexual orientation may not identify all people of a certain orientation in the same way. Measures of sexual attraction, sexual activity, and sexual identity identify different (though often overlapping) populations. Laumann et al. (1994) found that of the 8.6% of women reporting some same gender sexuality, 88% reported same gender sexual attraction, 41% reported some same gender sexual behaviour and 16% reported a lesbian or gay identity.

See also

 Affectional orientation

References

Further reading
 Klein, Fritz, MD. The Bisexual Option, Second Edition . Binghamton, NY: The Haworth Press, 1993. . .
 Klein Sexual Orientation Grid—Online version of original Klein Sexual Orientation Grid.

1987 introductions
Bisexuality
Human sexuality
LGBT and society
Sexology
Sexual orientation and science